Andy Richter Controls the Universe is a sitcom which aired from 2002–2003 on the Fox network. The series was Andy Richter's first starring role after leaving NBC's Late Night with Conan O'Brien in 2000.

Running for two seasons, totaling nineteen episodes, it was canceled due in part to low ratings. The show was a joint production of Garfield Grove Productions and 20th Century Fox Television in association with Paramount Television.

TV Guide included the series in their 2013 list of 60 shows that were "Cancelled Too Soon".

Characters
The surnames of the characters are very rarely mentioned – with the exception of Andy, most are only mentioned once in the entire series.

Main

 Andy Richter: The character, sharing his name with the actor, is an aspiring writer living in Chicago who wants to write short stories. However, he is forced to work as a technical manual writer for Pickering Industries, the fifth largest company in America, to pay the bills. Andy is shy and not good with women. He doesn't really want to be working at the company, though he is very good at his job.
 Jessica Green (played by Paget Brewster): Jessica worked with Andy for years before she became the head of Andy's department, and thus, his boss. They tried dating once, but it didn't work out. She often has to act as an intermediary between her superiors and Andy and his co-workers, forcing her to take sides. She is fairly superficial when it comes to men.
 Wendy McKay (played by Irene Molloy): Wendy is the receptionist at Andy's office. As of the pilot, she had only been working there a month. Andy is attracted to her, but found out that since he had not made a move in a month, Keith has started to date her.
 Byron Togler (played by Jonathan Slavin): Byron is a new illustrator who moves into Andy's office, which causes Andy annoyance in the pilot episode. Byron is fairly insecure and shy.
 Keith (played by James Patrick Stuart): Keith is Andy's best friend and co-worker and one usually sticks up for the other. He is the handsome guy in the office who has things handed to him because he's good-looking.

Others
Pickering Industries is founded by Mr. Pickering (John Bliss) in 1880. Despite being over 170 years old, and dead, he appears in several episodes and has discussions with Andy within his imagination. His viewpoints are typically antiquated and contrary to political correctness to an extreme degree. His comments often seem to represent a negative aspect of Andy's mind, such as guilt, or self-doubt.

Teak (Charlie Finn) and Phil (Sean Gunn) live in the same building as Andy. They had been members of the same fraternity as Andy, ten years after Andy was a member.  As such, they look up to him. It is hinted that Phil might be homosexual.

Guest appearances
Conan O'Brien appears as Pickering's new CEO in the episode "Crazy in Rio." Other stars to have guest roles include Cedric Yarbrough, Jon Cryer, Molly Sims, Beth Littleford, Rick Peters, Bree Turner, Jarrad Paul, Rex Lee, Lola Glaudini, Patricia Belcher and June Lockhart, who plays Andy's grandmother.

Episodes

Broadcast history

Season 1 (2002)

Season 2 (2002–03)

Production
Although canceled after two mid-season runs (totaling 19 episodes), reruns of all 19 episodes aired on HDNet from mid 2003 until 2006. It was also shown on the Paramount Comedy Channel, the Irish network TV3 and on the Polish edition of Comedy Central.

The outside shots of Andy's office are taken from the Duke & Duke building from Trading Places.

Structure
The series' plots were fairly typical of sitcoms with Andy getting himself into a situation and having to find a solution. The unique aspects were several unusual devices that defined the show.

First was Richter's voiceover which essentially narrated the plot as well as Andy's thought processes in each episode. Secondly, and connected to the first, was Andy's imagination, which was presented onscreen as if it were reality until it was revealed in a smash cut accompanied by the sound of rewinding audio tape. This was often used to demonstrate alternatives to what actually happened for a given event. These fantasy sequences inspired the original working title, "Anything Can Happen," a sentiment Richter expresses in the series premiere's opening narration.

Home release
On March 24, 2009, CBS DVD (distributed by Paramount) released all 19 episodes of Andy Richter Controls the Universe on DVD in Region 1.

20th Century Fox Home Entertainment holds the international DVD rights, but has yet to make a release anywhere.

Soundtrack
All music from the show was written by Greg Burns, Jeff Burns, and Brian Kirk. The theme song is sung by Jason Cropper, the original guitarist for Weezer. The song was written for the show, and there is not a full version beyond the short clip in the beginning. However, a slightly longer version of the song is evident on the pilot episode.

See also
 Quintuplets – Andy Richter's subsequent sitcom
 Andy Barker, P.I. – Andy Richter's third sitcom

References

External links 

 

2000s American single-camera sitcoms
2002 American television series debuts
2003 American television series endings
2000s American workplace comedy television series
English-language television shows
Fox Broadcasting Company original programming
Television series by CBS Studios 
Television series by 20th Century Fox Television 
Television shows set in Chicago
Television series created by Victor Fresco